Stefan Dohr (born September 3, 1965 in Münster) is a German horn player and currently the principal horn of the Berlin Philharmonic Orchestra (Berliner Philharmoniker). Apart from being a sought-after masterclass teacher, he teaches the horn at the Herbert von Karajan Academy.

Biography
Stefan Dohr studied with Prof. Wolfgang Wilhelmi at the Musikhochschule in Essen and with Prof. Erich Penzel in Cologne before obtaining the Solo Horn position of the Frankfurt Opera House at the age of 19.

He held the same position with the Bayreuth Festival Orchestra, the Orchestre Philharmonique de Nice and the Deutsches Symphonie-Orchester Berlin. In 1993 Stefan Dohr was chosen to play principal horn of the Berlin Philharmonic.

As soloist, Stefan Dohr has worked with many celebrated conductors, among them Daniel Barenboim, Bernard Haitink and Christian Thielemann as well as Claudio Abbado, who also invited him to appear as principal horn with the Lucerne Festival Orchestra.

Besides the solo-repertoire of the classic and romantic period, Stefan Dohr’s interest is focused on contemporary works e.g. by György Ligeti, Oliver Knussen and Volker David Kirchner. In March 2008 he played the world premiere of a horn concerto specially composed for him by Austrian composer Herbert Willi.

His engagements as a sought after chamber musician include various ensembles with his Philharmonic colleagues as well performances with partners such as Maurizio Pollini, Lars Vogt, Kolja Blacher, Ian Bostridge. He is also a constant member of the Ensemble Wien-Berlin. This Group celebrated its 25th anniversary in 2008 with a series of concerts, among them one at the Lucerne Festival where the ensemble performed the world premiere of a new piece by Australian composer Brett Dean.

In July 2007, the CD „Opera“ which Stefan Dohr had recorded with his colleagues of the Berlin Philharmonic Horn Section was released.

In May 2021, Dohr was one of 10 new members elected to the Royal Swedish Academy of Music, alongside Marika Field, Katarina Karnéus, Jonas Knutsson, Sten Sandell, Đuro Živković, Keiko Abe, Giancarlo Andretta, Richard Sparks, and Quincy Jones.

References

External links
 www.StefanDohr.com
  Stefan Dohr as member of the Berlin Philharmonic
Robert Schumann, Konzertstueck fuer 4 Hoerner (3rd movement), Podcast

German classical horn players
1965 births
Living people
Players of the Berlin Philharmonic